Inga flava is a moth in the family Oecophoridae. It was described by Zeller in 1839. It is found in Colombia, Peru and Brazil.

References

Moths described in 1839
Inga (moth)